José Francisco Encina Moriamez (born 18 December 1943) is a Chilean politician who served as President of the Chamber of Deputies and as a member of the Chamber of Deputies, representing District 8 of the Coquimbo Region.

References

1943 births
Living people
Presidents of the Chamber of Deputies of Chile
University of Chile alumni
People from Concepción, Chile